Islam Aslanov is an Uzbekistani Paralympic swimmer. He won the bronze medal in the men's 100 metre butterfly S13 event at the 2020 Summer Paralympics held in Tokyo, Japan.

Career
In 2018, he won three gold medals, one silver medal and one bronze medal at the Asian Para Games held in Jakarta, Indonesia.

He won the bronze medal in the men's 4 × 100 metre medley relay at the 2014 Asian Games held in Incheon, South Korea. He also competed in two individual events: the men's 50 metre butterfly and men's 100 metre butterfly events. In the men's 4 × 100 metre freestyle relay he finished in 5th place in the final.

In 2019, he won the silver medal in the men's 50 metre freestyle S13 event at the World Para Swimming Championships held in London, United Kingdom. He also won the silver medal in both the men's 100 metre freestyle S13 event and men's 100 metre butterfly S13 event.

References

External links 
 

Living people
Year of birth missing (living people)
Place of birth missing (living people)
Uzbekistani male butterfly swimmers
S13-classified Paralympic swimmers
Medalists at the World Para Swimming Championships
Uzbekistani male freestyle swimmers
Uzbekistani male breaststroke swimmers
Asian Games medalists in swimming
Swimmers at the 2014 Asian Games
Medalists at the 2014 Asian Games
Asian Games bronze medalists for Uzbekistan
Swimmers at the 2020 Summer Paralympics
Medalists at the 2020 Summer Paralympics
Paralympic bronze medalists for Uzbekistan
Paralympic medalists in swimming
Paralympic swimmers of Uzbekistan
21st-century Uzbekistani people
Medalists at the 2014 Asian Para Games
Medalists at the 2018 Asian Para Games